Frane Vinko Golem (4 October 1938 – 11 August 2007) was a Croatian diplomat and politician.

Golem, a physician by profession, was the Croatian Minister of Foreign Affairs from November 1990 to May 1991. In 1992 he founded the Department for Endocrine Surgery at the KBC Šalata in Zagreb.

Honours
Order of Danica Hrvatska with the image of Katarina Zrinska
Order of the Croatian Trefoil
Homeland War Memorial Medal
Homeland's Gratitude Medal

References

1938 births
2007 deaths
People from Trilj
Croatian Democratic Union politicians
Croatian diplomats
Croatian surgeons
School of Medicine, University of Zagreb alumni
Foreign ministers of Croatia
Representatives in the modern Croatian Parliament
20th-century surgeons